The Week was a socialist magazine founded by Ken Coates and Pat Jordan in January 1964. The magazine was edited by Jordan as the journal of the International Group and aimed at a readership in the left wing of the Labour Party. Coates and Jordan were Marxist members of the Labour Party connected to the New Left Review, to which Marxist journalist Claud Cockburn occasionally contributed. Their version of The Week, named after the earlier The Week that had been edited by Cockburn, provided a socialist critique of Harold Wilson's government, notably over its failure to oppose the Vietnam War. Jordan edited the paper until 1968, when he cooperated with Tariq Ali in launching The Black Dwarf. At that time The Week became a monthly magazine called International, which was published by the International Marxist Group.

External links

 The Week at the Marxists Internet Archive

References

Monthly magazines published in the United Kingdom
News magazines published in the United Kingdom
Defunct political magazines published in the United Kingdom
English-language magazines
Magazines established in 1964
Magazines disestablished in 1968
Socialist magazines